Leonard Dowell (born 13 June 1902) was a Scottish professional footballer. He played for Gillingham between 1927 and 1931.

References

1902 births
Year of death missing
Scottish footballers
Gillingham F.C. players
Footballers from Edinburgh
Association footballers not categorized by position